Shop Girls of Paris or The Ladies' Delight (French: Au Bonheur des Dames) is a 1943 French historical drama film directed by André Cayatte and starring Michel Simon, Albert Préjean and Blanchette Brunoy. It is an adaptation of the 1883 novel Au Bonheur des Dames by Émile Zola.

The film was made by the German-backed company Continental Films. It was shot at the Billancourt Studios in Paris with location filming taking place at the Bon Marché department store. The film's sets were created by the art director Andrej Andrejew. The costumes were designed by Rosine Delamare

It was the second film adaptation of Zola's Au Bonheur des Dames, after Au Bonheur des Dames in 1930.

Plot
M. Baudu, an irascible old man, runs a small fabric shop in 1860s Paris. A large department store, the first of its kind, opens nearby, putting Baudu's business in peril. Things get even more complicated for him when his niece and two nephews, all recently orphaned, leave their small village to go live with him. Denise, his young niece, is hired as a saleswoman at the department store, to Baudu's displeasure. She does well at her job, and begins receiving both professional and romantic interest from the store's owner, the wealthy and charming Octave Mouret.

Cast 
 Michel Simon as M. Baudu
 Albert Préjean as Octave Mouret
 Blanchette Brunoy as Denise Baudu
 Suzy Prim as Henriette Desforges
 Juliette Faber as Mademoiselle Vadon  
 Huguette Vivier as Clara Prunaire  
 Santa Relli as Geneviève Baudu  
 Catherine Fonteney as Madame Aurélie 
 Jacqueline Gauthier as Pauline Cugnot 
 Maximilienne as Madame Cabin 
 Marcelle Rexiane as Madame Marly  
 Suzet Maïs as Madame de Boves - la kleptomane  
 André Reybaz as Jean Baudu  
 Jean Tissier as Émile Bourdoncle  
 Jean Rigaux as Baugé  
 Georges Chamarat as L'inspecteur Jouve  
 Pierre Bertin as Gaujon  
 René Blancard as Colomban 
 Dorette Ardenne as Une vendeuse  
 Odette Barencey as Madame Bédoré  
 Paul Barge as Un boutiquier 
 Jeannette Batti as Une vendeuse  
 Jacques Beauvais as Un boutiquier 
 Albert Broquin as Le cocher  
 Gustave Gallet as Lhomme  
 Pierre Labry as Achille Vingard - Le serrurier  
 Jacques Latrouite as Pépé Baudu 
 Palmyre Levasseur as L'acheteuse de mouchoirs  
 Albert Malbert as Le cafetier 
 Maurice Marceau as Un employé  
 Frédéric Moriss as Le comte de Boves 
 Julienne Paroli as Une boutiquière 
 Rambauville as Favier  
 Roger Vincent as Un boutiquier

Crew
 Director: André Cayatte
 Screenplay: André Cayatte, Michel Duran and André Legrand
 Assistant director: Jean Devaivre
 Cinematography: Armand Thirard
 Set design: André Andrejew
 Editing: Gérard Bensdorp
 Costumes: Rosine Delamare
 Production: Continental Films
 Head of production: Louis Sédrat

References

Bibliography
 Lanzoni, Rémi Fournier . French Cinema: From Its Beginnings to the Present. A&C Black, 2004.

External links 
 

1943 films
Films based on works by Émile Zola
Films directed by André Cayatte
French black-and-white films
Films set in the 1860s
Films set in Paris
French historical drama films
1940s historical drama films
Films shot at Billancourt Studios
Continental Films films
1940s French films